A lucid dream is a type of dream in which the dreamer becomes aware that they are dreaming while dreaming. During a lucid dream, the dreamer may gain some amount of control over the dream characters, narrative, or environment. Lucid dreaming has been studied and reported for many years. Prominent figures from ancient to modern times have been fascinated by lucid dreams and have sought ways to better understand their causes and purpose. 

Many different theories have emerged as a result of scientific research on the subject and have even been shown in pop culture. Further developments in psychological research have pointed to ways in which this form of dreaming may be utilized as a form of sleep therapy.

Etymology
The term lucid dream was coined by Dutch author and psychiatrist Frederik van Eeden in his 1913 article A Study of Dreams, though descriptions of dreamers being aware that they are dreaming predate the article. Van Eeden studied his own dreams between January 20, 1898 and December 26, 1912, recording the ones he deemed most important in a dream diary. 352 of these dreams are categorized as lucid.

Van Eeden created names for seven different types of dreams he experienced based on the data he collected:

 initial dreams
 pathological dreams
 ordinary dreams
 vivid dreams
 demoniacal dreams
 general dream-sensations
 lucid dreams

He said the seventh type, lucid dreaming, is "the most interesting and worthy of the most careful observation and study."

Definition
Paul Tholey laid the epistemological basis for the research of lucid dreams, proposing seven different conditions of clarity that a dream must fulfill in order to be defined as a lucid dream:

 Awareness of the dream state (orientation)
 Awareness of the capacity to make decisions
 Awareness of memory functions
 Awareness of self
 Awareness of the dream environment
 Awareness of the meaning of the dream
 Awareness of concentration and focus (the subjective clarity of that state)

Later, in 1992, a study by Deirdre Barrett examined whether lucid dreams contained four "corollaries" of lucidity:
 The dreamer is aware that they are dreaming
 They are aware actions will not carry over after waking
 Physical laws need not apply in the dream
 The dreamer has a clear memory of the waking world
Barrett found less than a quarter of lucidity accounts exhibited all four.

Subsequently, Stephen LaBerge studied the prevalence of being able to control the dream scenario among lucid dreams, and found that while dream control and dream awareness are correlated, neither requires the other. LaBerge found dreams that exhibit one clearly without the capacity for the other; also, in some dreams where the dreamer is lucid and aware they could exercise control, they choose simply to observe.

History

Ancient
The practice of lucid dreaming, as in cultivating the dreamer's ability to be aware that they are dreaming, is central to both the ancient Indian Hindu practice of Yoga nidra and the Tibetan Buddhist practice of dream Yoga. The cultivation of such awareness was a common practice among early Buddhists.

Early references to the phenomenon are also found in ancient Greek writing. For example, the philosopher Aristotle wrote: "often when one is asleep, there is something in consciousness which declares that what then presents itself is but a dream". Meanwhile, the physician Galen of Pergamon used lucid dreams as a form of therapy.  In addition, a letter written by Saint Augustine of Hippo in AD 415 tells the story of a dreamer, Doctor Gennadius, and refers to lucid dreaming.

17th century
Philosopher and physician Sir Thomas Browne (1605–1682)  was fascinated by dreams and described his own ability to lucid dream in his Religio Medici, stating: "...yet in one dream I can compose a whole Comedy, behold the action, apprehend the jests and laugh my self awake at the conceits thereof".

Samuel Pepys in his diary entry for 15 August 1665 records a dream, stating: "I had my Lady Castlemayne in my arms and was admitted to use all the dalliance I desired with her, and then dreamt that this could not be awake, but that it was only a dream".

19th century
In 1867, the French sinologist Marie-Jean-Léon, Marquis d'Hervey de Saint Denys  anonymously published Les Rêves et Les Moyens de Les Diriger; Observations Pratiques ('Dreams and the ways to direct them; practical observations'), in which he describes his own experiences of lucid dreaming, and proposes that it is possible for anyone to learn to dream consciously.

20th century

In 1913, Dutch psychiatrist and writer Frederik (Willem) van Eeden (1860–1932) coined the term 'lucid dream' in an article entitled "A Study of Dreams".

Some have suggested that the term is a misnomer because Van Eeden was referring to a phenomenon more specific than a lucid dream. Van Eeden intended the term lucid to denote "having insight", as in the phrase a lucid interval applied to someone in temporary remission from a psychosis, rather than as a reference to the perceptual quality of the experience, which may or may not be clear and vivid.

Neural mechanism
In 1968, Celia Green analyzed the main characteristics of such dreams, reviewing previously published literature on the subject and incorporating new data from participants of her own. She concluded that lucid dreams were a category of experience quite distinct from ordinary dreams and said they were associated with rapid eye movement sleep (REM sleep). Green was also the first to link lucid dreams to the phenomenon of false awakenings.

In 1975, Dr Keith Hearne had the idea to exploit the nature of Rapid Eye Movements (REM) to allow a dreamer to send a message directly from dreams to the waking world. Working with an experienced lucid dreamer (Alan Worsley),  he eventually succeeded in recording (via the use of an electrooculogram or EOG) a pre-defined set of eye movements signalled from within Worsley's lucid dream. This occurred at around 8 am on the morning of April 12, 1975. Hearne's EOG experiment was formally recognized through publication in the journal for The Society for Psychical Research. Lucid dreaming was subsequently researched by asking dreamers to perform pre-determined physical responses while experiencing a dream, including eye movement signals.

In 1980, Stephen LaBerge at Stanford University developed such techniques as part of his doctoral dissertation.  In 1985, LaBerge performed a pilot study that showed that time perception while counting during a lucid dream is about the same as during waking life. Lucid dreamers counted out ten seconds while dreaming, signaling the start and the end of the count with a pre-arranged eye signal measured with electrooculogram recording. LaBerge's results were confirmed by German researchers D. Erlacher and M. Schredl in 2004.

In a further study by Stephen LaBerge, four subjects were compared either singing while dreaming or counting while dreaming. LaBerge found that the right hemisphere was more active during singing and the left hemisphere was more active during counting.

Neuroscientist J. Allan Hobson has hypothesized what might be occurring in the brain while lucid. The first step to lucid dreaming is recognizing one is dreaming. This recognition might occur in the dorsolateral prefrontal cortex, which is one of the few areas deactivated during REM sleep and where working memory occurs. Once this area is activated and the recognition of dreaming occurs, the dreamer must be cautious to let the dream continue but be conscious enough to remember that it is a dream. While maintaining this balance, the amygdala and parahippocampal cortex might be less intensely activated. To continue the intensity of the dream hallucinations, it is expected the pons and the parieto-occipital junction stay active.

Using electroencephalography (EEG) and other polysomnographical measurements, LaBerge and others have shown that lucid dreams begin in the Rapid Eye Movement (REM) stage of sleep. LaBerge also proposes that there are higher amounts of beta-1 frequency band (13–19 Hz) brain wave activity experienced by lucid dreamers, hence there is an increased amount of activity in the parietal lobes making lucid dreaming a conscious process.

Paul Tholey, a German Gestalt psychologist and a professor of psychology and sports science, originally studied dreams in order to resolve the question of whether one dreams in colour or black and white. In his phenomenological research, he outlined an epistemological frame using critical realism. Tholey instructed his subjects to continuously suspect waking life to be a dream, in order that such a habit would manifest itself during dreams. He called this technique for inducing lucid dreams the Reflexionstechnik (reflection technique). Subjects learned to have such lucid dreams; they observed their dream content and reported it soon after awakening. Tholey could examine the cognitive abilities of dream figures. Nine trained lucid dreamers were directed to set other dream figures arithmetic and verbal tasks during lucid dreaming. Dream figures who agreed to perform the tasks proved more successful in verbal than in arithmetic tasks. Tholey discussed his scientific results with Stephen LaBerge, who has a similar approach.

A study was conducted by Stephen LaBerge and other scientists to see if it were possible to attain the ability to lucid dream through a drug. In 2018, galantamine was given to 121 patients in a double-blind, placebo-controlled trial, the only one of its kind. Some participants found as much as a 42 percent increase in their ability to lucid dream, compared to self-reports from the past six months, and ten people experienced a lucid dream for the first time. It is theorized that galantamine allows acetylcholine to build up, leading to greater recollection and awareness during dreaming.

Two-way communication

Teams of cognitive scientists established real-time two-way communication with people undergoing a lucid dream. During dreaming they were able to consciously communicate with experimenters via eye movements or facial muscle signals, were able to comprehend complex questions and use working memory. Such interactive lucid dreaming could be a new approach for the scientific exploration of the dream state and could have applications for learning and creativity.

Alternative theories
Other researchers suggest that lucid dreaming is not a state of sleep, but of brief wakefulness, or "micro-awakening". Experiments by Stephen LaBerge used "perception of the outside world" as a criterion for wakefulness while studying lucid dreamers, and their sleep state was corroborated with physiological measurements. LaBerge's subjects experienced their lucid dream while in a state of REM, which critics felt may mean that the subjects are fully awake. J Allen Hobson responded that lucid dreaming must be a state of both waking and dreaming.

Philosopher Norman Malcolm has argued against the possibility of checking the accuracy of dream reports, pointing out that "the only criterion of the truth of a statement that someone has had a certain dream is, essentially, his saying so."

Prevalence and frequency
In 2016, a meta-analytic study by David Saunders and colleagues on 34 lucid dreaming studies, taken from a period of 50 years, demonstrated that 55% of a pooled sample of 24,282 people claimed to have experienced lucid dreams at least once or more in their lifetime. Furthermore, for those that stated they did experience lucid dreams, approximately 23% reported to experience them on a regular basis, as often as once a month or more. In a 2004 study on lucid dream frequency and personality, a moderate correlation between nightmare frequency and frequency of lucid dreaming was demonstrated. Some lucid dreamers also reported that nightmares are a trigger for dream lucidity. Previous studies have reported that lucid dreaming is more common among adolescents than adults.

A 2015 study by Julian Mutz and Amir-Homayoun Javadi showed that people who had practiced meditation for a long time tended to have more lucid dreams. The authors claimed that "Lucid dreaming is a hybrid state of consciousness with features of both waking and dreaming" in a review they published in Neuroscience of Consciousness in 2017.

Mutz and Javadi found that during lucid dreaming, there is an increase in activity of the dorsolateral prefrontal cortex, the bilateral frontopolar prefrontal cortex, the precuneus, the inferior parietal lobules, and the supramarginal gyrus. All are brain functions related to higher cognitive functions including working memory, planning, and self-consciousness. The researchers also found that during a lucid dream, "levels of self-determination" were similar to those that people experienced during states of wakefulness. They also found that lucid dreamers can only control limited aspects of their dream at once.

Mutz and Javadi also have stated that by studying lucid dreaming further, scientists could learn more about various types of consciousness, which happen to be less easy to separate and research at other times.

Suggested applications

Treating nightmares
It has been suggested that those who suffer from nightmares could benefit from the ability to be aware they are indeed dreaming. A pilot study performed in 2006 showed that lucid dreaming therapy treatment was successful in reducing nightmare frequency. This treatment consisted of exposure to the idea, mastery of the technique, and lucidity exercises. It was not clear what aspects of the treatment were responsible for the success of overcoming nightmares, though the treatment as a whole was said to be successful.

Australian psychologist Milan Colic has explored the application of principles from narrative therapy to clients' lucid dreams, to reduce the impact not only of nightmares during sleep but also depression, self-mutilation, and other problems in waking life. Colic found that therapeutic conversations could reduce the distressing content of dreams, while understandings about life—and even characters—from lucid dreams could be applied to their lives with marked therapeutic benefits.

Psychotherapists have applied lucid dreaming as a part of therapy. Studies have shown that, by inducing a lucid dream, recurrent nightmares can be alleviated. It is unclear whether this alleviation is due to lucidity or the ability to alter the dream itself. A 2006 study performed by Victor Spoormaker and Van den Bout evaluated the validity of lucid dreaming treatment (LDT) in chronic nightmare sufferers. LDT is composed of exposure, mastery and lucidity exercises. Results of lucid dreaming treatment revealed that the nightmare frequency of the treatment groups had decreased. In another study, Spoormaker, Van den Bout, and Meijer (2003) investigated lucid dreaming treatment for nightmares by testing eight subjects who received a one-hour individual session, which consisted of lucid dreaming exercises. The results of the study revealed that the nightmare frequency had decreased and the sleep quality had slightly increased.

Holzinger, Klösch, and Saletu managed a psychotherapy study under the working name of ‘Cognition during dreaming—a therapeutic intervention in nightmares’, which included 40 subjects, men and women, 18–50 years old, whose life quality was significantly altered by nightmares. The test subjects were administered Gestalt group therapy and 24 of them were also taught to enter the state of lucid dreaming by Holzinger. This was purposefully taught in order to change the course of their nightmares. The subjects then reported the diminishment of their nightmare prevalence from 2–3 times a week to 2–3 times per month.

Creativity
In her book The Committee of Sleep, Deirdre Barrett describes how some experienced lucid dreamers have learned to remember specific practical goals such as artists looking for inspiration seeking a show of their own work once they become lucid or computer programmers looking for a screen with their desired code. However, most of these dreamers had many experiences of failing to recall waking objectives before gaining this level of control.

Exploring the World of Lucid Dreaming by Stephen LaBerge and Howard Rheingold (1990) discusses creativity within dreams and lucid dreams, including testimonials from a number of people who claim they have used the practice of lucid dreaming to help them solve a number of creative issues, from an aspiring parent thinking of potential baby names to a surgeon practicing surgical techniques. The authors discuss how creativity in dreams could stem from "conscious access to the contents of our unconscious minds"; access to "tacit knowledge"—the things we know but can't explain, or things we know but are unaware that we know.

The Dreams Behind the Music book by Craig Webb (2016) details lucid dreams of a number of musical artists, including how they are able not just to hear, but also compose, mix, arrange, practice, and perform music while conscious within their dreams.

Risks 
Though lucid dreaming can be beneficial to a number of aspects of life, some risks have been suggested. Those who have never had a lucid dream may not understand what is happening when they experience it for the first time. This could cause those individuals to feel a variety of different emotions as they are going through a completely new psychological experience. Feelings of stress, worry, or confusion could arise. On the other hand, the feeling of empowerment could also come up as they realize that they are now in control of their dreams. Individuals who experience lucid dreams regularly could begin to feel isolated from others due to the fact that they have different experiences when it comes to dreaming. Someone struggling with certain mental illnesses could find it hard to be able to tell the difference between reality and the actual dream (psychosis).

A very small percentage of people may experience sleep paralysis, which is something that can sometimes be confused with lucid dreaming. Although from the outside, both of these seem to be quite similar, there are a few distinct differences that can help differentiate them. A person usually experiences sleep paralysis when they partially wake up in REM atonia, a state in which said person is partially paralyzed and cannot move their limbs. When in sleep paralysis, people may also experience hallucinations. Although said hallucinations cannot cause physical damage, they may still be frightening. There are three common types of hallucinations: an intruder in the same room, a crushing feeling on one's chest or back, and a feeling of flying or levitating. About 7.6% of the general population have experienced sleep paralysis at least once. Exiting sleep paralysis to a waking state can be achieved by intently focusing on a part of the body, such as a finger, and wiggling it, continuing the action of moving to then the hand, the arm, and so on, until the person is fully awake.

Long-term risks with lucid dreaming have not been extensively studied, although many people have been lucid dreaming for many years without any adverse effects.

See also

 Active imagination
 Astral projection
 Oneirology
 Pre-lucid dream
 Recurring dream
 Sleep paralysis
 Yoga nidra
 Dream character

References

Further reading

 Blanken, C.M. den and Meijer, E.J.G. "An Historical View of Dreams and the Ways to Direct Them; Practical Observations by Marie-Jean-Léon-Lecoq, le Marquis d'Hervey-Saint-Denys". Lucidity Letter, 7 (2) 67–78; 1988. Revised Edition in: Lucidity, 10 (1&2) 311–22; 1991.
 
 
 
 
 
 
 
 
 
 Tholey, Paul (1983). "Relation between dream content and eye movements tested by lucid dreams". Perceptual and Motor Skills, 56, pp. 875–78.
 Tholey, Paul (1988). "A model for lucidity training as a means of self-healing and psychological growth". In: J. Gackenbach & S. LaBerge (eds.), Conscious mind, sleeping brain. Perspectives on lucid dreaming, pp. 263–87. London: Plenum Press.
 
 Lucid dreaming can be induced by electric scalp stimulation, study finds 
 "A look at four psychology fads"  – a comparison of est, primal therapy, Transcendental Meditation and lucid dreaming at the Los Angeles Times

External links 
 

 
Phenomena
Sleep physiology